The western crocodile skink  or false Poncelet's helmet skink  (Tribolonotus pseudoponceleti) is a species of lizard in the family Scincidae. The species is found in Bougainville and Buka.

References

Tribolonotus
Reptiles of Papua New Guinea
Reptiles described in 1968
Natural history of Bougainville Island